He-Man is a character from the Masters of the Universe media franchise.

He-Man may also refer to:

Animation
He-Man and the Masters of the Universe, 1983-1985 animated series
He-Man & She-Ra: A Christmas Special, 1985 animation special
The New Adventures of He-Man, 1990 animated series
He-Man and the Masters of the Universe (2002 TV series), revival of the 1980s animated series
He-Man and the Masters of the Universe (2021 TV series), revival of the 1980s animated series

Video games
He-Man: Power of Grayskull, 2003 role-playing video game for the Game Boy Advance
He-Man: Defender of Grayskull, 2005 multi-platform action-adventure game

Films
Masters of the Universe (film), 1987 American film starring Dolph Lundgren as He-Man
He-Man (film), 2011 Chinese film, unrelated to the comic character

See also
He (disambiguation)
Man (disambiguation)
Heman (disambiguation)
Masters of the Universe (disambiguation)
Machismo
She-Man (film)